Madhuranagar railway station located at City of Vijayawada (station code:MDUN), is an Indian Railways station located in Andhra Pradesh. It is situated on Duvvada–Vijayawada section of Vijayawada railway division in South Coast Railway zone.

Classification 
It falls under HG-2 railway station category.

References

External links 
 

Railway stations in Krishna district
Railway stations in Vijayawada railway division
Transport in Krishna district
Buildings and structures in Krishna district